The 2016 World Indoor Target Archery Championships was the 13th edition of the World Indoor Archery Championships. The event was held in Ankara, Turkey, from 1 to 6 March 2016, and was organized by World Archery.

Events

Recurve

Senior

Junior

Compound

Senior

Junior

Medal table

Participating nations
34 nations registered 262 athletes across disciplines, 11 fewer country and 91 athletes fewer than in Nîmes in 2014.

  (9)
  (8)
  (1)
  (3)
  (6)
  (4) 
  (9)
  (2)
  (17)
  (12)
  (10)
  (1)
  (3)
  (1)
  (2)
  (1)
  (15)
  (24)
  (7)
  (1)
  (5)
  (2)
  (3)
  (3)
  (11)
  (1)
  (24)
  (2)
  (1)
  (7)
  (4)
  (24)
  (19)
  20)

References

External links
Complete Results Book

World Championship
Archery
International archery competitions hosted by Turkey
2016
2016